The 1967 Ohio State Buckeyes football team represented the Ohio State University in the 1967 Big Ten Conference football season. The Buckeyes compiled a 6–3 record.

Schedule

Personnel

Depth chart

Game summaries

Arizona

Oregon

Purdue

Northwestern

Illinois

Michigan State

Wisconsin

Iowa

at Michigan

Rudy Hubbard, who had only carried the ball 45 times in his three-year career prior to the game, rushed for 104 yards on 15 carries and scored the first two touchdowns of the game.

1968 NFL draftees

References

Ohio State
Ohio State Buckeyes football seasons
 Ohio State Buckeyes football